Acacia ligustrina is a shrub or tree belonging to the genus Acacia and the subgenus Phyllodineae that is endemic to south western Australia.

Description
The branchlets of the plants are covered with more or less straight hairs. Like most species of Acacia it has phyllodes rather than true leaves. The evergreen phyllodes are often shallowly recurved and have an asymmetrical oblong-elliptic or narrowly elliptic shape. It produces yellow flowers from August to October.

Distribution
It is native to an area in the Mid West and Wheatbelt regions of Western Australia where it is commonly situated on low hills, around salt flats and depressions growing in loamy, clay or sandy clay soils often containing lateritic gravel.

See also
List of Acacia species

References

ligustrina
Acacias of Western Australia
Taxa named by Carl Meissner
Plants described in 1848